Christiane Maybach (1932–2006) was a German film and television actress. She became known as "Berlin's Marilyn Monroe" due to work in films from the 1950s to the 1970s. She continued to act in television roles until shortly before her death in 2006.

Life
Maybach was born in Berlin, Germany on March 14, 1932, was educated at the acting school of the Schillertheater beginning in 1956, and worked on the stage before becoming a film actress during the 1950s, a career she continued to pursue until the 1970s. She then continued her acting career on television, performing until shortly before her death. She died in Cologne, Germany on April 12, 2006.

Selected filmography

 Fanfares of Love (1951) - (uncredited)
 I Lost My Heart in Heidelberg (1952) - Rita, Studentin
 Fireworks (1954) - Jasmine (uncredited)
 Heimatland (1955) - Lisa
 In Hamburg When the Nights Are Long (1956)
 Musikparade (1956) - Helga
 Ein Mann muß nicht immer schön sein (1956) - Otti Springfeld
 Frauen sind für die Liebe da (1957) - Schütze Sabine
 The Girl Without Pyjamas (1957) - Marion Klenk
 Das Glück liegt auf der Straße (1957) - Sylvia
 Two Bavarians in the Harem (1957) - Bardame Cora
 Greetings and Kisses from Tegernsee (1957) - Steffi
 Wenn die Bombe platzt (1958) - Lilly
 Hoppla, jetzt kommt Eddie (1958) - Lilli
 Sehnsucht hat mich verführt (1958) - Elvira
 Der lachende Vagabund (1958) - Diana
 Stefanie (1958) - Gabriele
 The Head (1959) - Stella - alias Lilly
 Heimat, deine Lieder (1959) - Beate, Pauls Verlobte
 The High Life (1960) - Tilly Scherer
 The Thousand Eyes of Dr. Mabuse (1960) - Maid (uncredited)
 Eine hübscher als die andere (1961) - Dorothee Liebig
 Axel Munthe, The Doctor of San Michele (1962) - Paulette
 Escape from East Berlin (1962) - Frau Eckhardt (uncredited)
 Es war mir ein Vergnügen (1963) - Maria Rivaldi
 Das Haus auf dem Hügel (1964) - Marion, Bardame
 That Man in Istanbul (1965)
 A Study in Terror (1965) - Polly Nichols
 El marqués (1965) - The blonde
 Z7 Operation Rembrandt (1966) - Consuela
 Top Crack (1967)
 Weiße Haut auf schwarzem Markt (1969)
 The Bordello (1971) - Tilly
 $ (1971) - Helga
 Naughty Nymphs (1972) - Tante Lilofee
 All People Will Be Brothers (1973) - Die Rote
 Fox and His Friends (1975) - Hedwig
 Satan's Brew (1976) - Agentin, Agentur Milutinovic
 Game of Losers (1978) - Frau Holle
 Just a Gigolo (1978) - Gilda
 Die unglaublichen Abenteuer des Guru Jakob (1983) - Gräfin Falkenberg
 Die Story (1984) - Verlegerin
 Das Wunder (1985) - Raoul's mother
 Die Venusfalle (1988)

References

Bibliography

External links

1932 births
2006 deaths
German film actresses
German television actresses
Actresses from Berlin
Burials at the Waldfriedhof Zehlendorf